The Persian Revolt was a campaign led by Cyrus the Great in which the province of ancient Persis, which had been under Median rule, declared its independence and fought a successful revolution, separating from the Median Empire. Cyrus and the Persians did not stop there, however, and in turn went on and conquered the Medes.

Herodotus's Account 
The events leading to the revolt are covered in writings by the Greek historian Herodotus. It is said that Astyages, the King of the Median Empire, had a dream in which his daughter, Mandane of Media, would give birth to a son who would overthrow him and destroy his empire. Fearful that this dream would come to be reality, he married her to Cambyses of Anshan, whom he deemed nonthreatening to his empire.

Cambyses and Mandane had a son, Cyrus II, and they lived peacefully immediately following the child's birth. However, this would not last as Astyages had a second dream foretelling of the destruction of his empire. With this, he decided to have the child killed, and sent a general of his, Harpagus, to kill the child. Though Harpagus was loyal to his king, he did not wish to spill royal blood. So he found a shepherd who had fathered a stillborn child, and gave Cyrus to him, and took the stillborn child to his king to prove that the baby was dead, which was enough to calm Astyages.

Cyrus grew up with the shepherd, and was ultimately found by Astyages to be the living son of Cambyses when he was ten years old. Astyages had now planned to kill the boy, but didn't under the advice of a magus, opting to let him live, and punish Harpagus. His punishment was a banquet in which Astyages fed his general his own son. Cyrus would succeed his father as ruler of Anshan, and with the advice of Harpagus, as well as the backing of his small empire, planned the revolt.

The Revolt
The revolt lasted from 552 BC to 550 BC. The war spread to other provinces who allied with the Persians. The Medes had early successes in battle, but the comeback by Cyrus the Great and his army, which is said to have included Harpagus, now allied with the Persians, was too overwhelming, and the Medes were finally conquered by 549 BC. Thus the first official Persian Empire was born.

Result
With Astyages defeated, Cyrus the Great, treated the deposed Median King with honor, sparing him and allowing him to keep a position within Cyrus's court. The Persian Empire would grow from once being under the rule of the Medians to incorporating many other states due to the campaigns of Cyrus the Great, who would go on to take over the Lydian Empire and later Asia Minor.

See also 

Battle of Hyrba

References

Bibliography

Ancient sources
The Nabonidus Chronicle of the Babylonian Chronicles

Herodotus (The Histories) I, 127
Ctesias (Persica)
Diodorus Siculus (Bibliotheca historica)
Justin, Epitome of the Philippic History of Pompeius Trogus 
Fragments of Nicolas of Damascus
Strabo (History), (XV 3.8)

Modern sources
  Ilya Gershevitch, ed., The Cambridge History of Iran.  Vol. 2: The Median and Achaemenian Periods.  Cambridge University Press (1985)

External links
  George Rawlinson, The Seven Great Monarchies of the Ancient Eastern World -- v. 3 (of 7): Media  

552 BC
6th-century BC conflicts
Battles involving the Medes
Iranian civil wars
Battles of Cyrus the Great